Songs the Lord Taught Us is the debut album by the American rock band the Cramps. It was released in 1980 on I.R.S. Records in America and Illegal Records in England. In 2020, Rolling Stone included Songs the Lord Taught Us in their "80 Greatest albums of 1980" list, praising the band for its "psychobilly sound that went way beyond the kitschiest moments of the Ramones or Blondie and into a whole new realm of garage-trash novelty".

The track "I Was a Teenage Werewolf" was featured in the 2022 American slasher film Halloween Ends.

Track listing
Writing credits adapted from the album's liner notes.

Personnel

The Cramps
 Lux Interior – vocals
 Poison Ivy Rorschach – guitar
 Bryan Gregory – guitar
 Nick Knox – drums

Additional musicians
 Booker C – organ on "Fever"

Technical
 Alex Chilton – producer
 John Hampton – engineer
 Carl Grasso – art direction
 The Cramps – sleeve concept, mixing
 David Arnoff – photography

References

External links

Songs the Lord Taught Us (Adobe Flash) at Radio3Net (streamed copy where licensed)

1980 debut albums
The Cramps albums
I.R.S. Records albums
Illegal Records albums